The 2004 Norwegian Figure Skating Championships was held in Bergen from January 16 to 18, 2004. Skaters competed in the discipline of single skating. The results were used to choose the teams to the 2004 World Championships, the 2004 European Championships, the 2004 Nordic Championships, and the 2004 World Junior Championships.

Senior results

Ladies

External links
 
 results 

Norwegian Figure Skating Championships
Norwegian Figure Skating Championships, 2004
2004 in Norwegian sport